The 1922–23 season was Chelsea Football Club's fourteenth competitive season.

Table

References

External links
 1922–23 season at stamford-bridge.com

1922–23
English football clubs 1922–23 season